2CH can refer to:
 2CH, a commercial radio station in Sydney, Australia.
 2C-H or 2,5-dimethoxyphenethylamine
 2Ch. or Chronicles 2, a Hebrew prose work constituting part of Jewish and Christian scripture
 2channel or 2ch, a Japanese textboard
 Dvach or 2ch, a Russian imageboard